Mihail Lozanov (15 June 1911 – 3 December 1994), nicknamed The Tank (Танка, Tanka) was a Bulgarian footballer. A centre forward, Lozanov was a long-time player of PFC Levski Sofia in the 1930s and captained FC Bayern Munich in 1937–39, which makes him the only Bulgarian who was captain of the largest German club.

Club career
Born in the village of Tsarnel (today Lyulin) near Pernik in 1911, Lozanov started playing football at SC Krakra Pernik at age nine. The club had been newly co-founded by his brother Todor Lozanov. When he moved to the capital Sofia to attend high school, he transferred to powerhouse PFC Levski Sofia in 1930, where he spent most of his career. At Levski, Lozanov formed a formidable attacking trio with teammates Asen Panchev and Asen Peshev and scored 43 goals in 79 league games. Lozanov's attacking prowess earned him the nickname The Tank; reportedly, he once shattered the crossbar with a powerful shot. With Levski, Lozanov won the Bulgarian State Football Championship twice, in 1933 and 1937. These were Levski's first two championship titles.

As a student in Brno, Czechoslovakia in 1935, Lozanov played for local side SK Moravská Slavia. Then, Lozanov moved to Munich in Nazi Germany to continue his education as a civil engineer at the Munich Polytechnic School. In Munich, Lozanov represented and captained FC Bayern Munich, the most successful club in German history. Lozanov was a regular first team player in the Gauliga Bayern between 1937 and 1939, featuring for Bayern Munich alongside German internationals Ludwig Goldbrunner, Jakob Streitle and Wilhelm Simetsreiter.

Returning to Bulgaria, Lozanov continued his career at Levski Sofia for two more years until retiring from football in 1941 at age 30. In his later years, he was a mining engineer in Pernik.

International career
Mihail Lozanov was among the stars of the Bulgaria national football team in the 1930s. He debuted against Yugoslavia in a 0–1 loss in 1931 and played his last game against Germany in a 1–2 loss in 1939. In between, Lozanov won the Balkan Cup twice with Bulgaria, in 1932 and 1935. He also took part in the 1934 FIFA World Cup qualification cycle. For the national team, Lozanov recorded a total of 38 caps and 10 goals.

Honours
 Bulgarian State Football Championship: 2
 1933
 1937
 Balkan Cup: 2
 1932
 1935
 Bulgarian Olympic Committee Cup: 1
 1931

References

External links 
 Profile at LevskiSofia.info

1911 births
1994 deaths
Bulgarian footballers
Bulgaria international footballers
FC Bayern Munich footballers
PFC Levski Sofia players
Sportspeople from Pernik Province
Technical University of Munich alumni
Association football forwards